Civita is an Italian surname. Notable people with the surname include:

César Civita (1905–2005), Italian Argentine publisher
Roberto Civita (1936–2013), Brazilian businessman and publisher
Victor Civita (1907–1990), Brazilian businessman, publisher and philanthropist
Ramiro Civita, Argentine cinematographer

See also
Tullio Levi-Civita (1873–1941), Italian mathematician

Italian-language surnames